Promised Land is an American family drama television series that premiered on January 24, 2022 on ABC. The story focuses on Joe Sandoval, patriarch of two blended Latino families who runs a successful Sonoma County, California vineyard and is preparing to hand the vineyard's management to one of his children. Two sub-plots involve the challenges of undocumented immigrants from Mexico who come to work at the vineyard, and conflicts with a hotel owner who blames Sandoval (who bought the vineyard from her father) for her father's death. The final five episodes of the series premiered on Hulu. In May 2022, the series was officially canceled after one season.

Cast and characters

Main
 John Ortiz as Joe Sandoval, the patriarch of the Sandoval family and owner of Heritage House Vineyards in Sonoma Valley
 Cecilia Suárez as Lettie Sandoval, Joe's second wife and the matriarch of the Sandoval family
 Augusto Aguilera as Mateo Flores, Lettie's son from a previous marriage and Joe's stepson who is the general manager of Heritage House Vineyards. He is also Billy's son and therefore secretly Joe's nephew. 
 Christina Ochoa as Veronica Sandoval, Joe's eldest daughter
 Mariel Molino as Carmen Sandoval, Joe's youngest daughter
 Tonatiuh as Antonio Sandoval, Joe's older son
 Andres Velez as Carlos Rincón, a young undocumented immigrant who crosses the border into the United States to work at Heritage House Vineyards in 1987. He becomes Jose/Joe Sandoval with fake papers from his brother Roberto/Billy. 
 Katya Martín as Juana Sánchez, a young undocumented immigrant who crosses the border into the United States with her sister, Rosa in 1987. She becomes Leticia/Letty with fake documents from Guillermo/Billy. 
 Rolando Chusan as Billy Rincón, an undocumented Heritage House Vineyards worker and Carlos' older brother in 1987. His birthname is Roberto; he assumes the name Guillermo (William/Billy in English) with fake documents. 
 Bellamy Young as Margaret Honeycroft, Joe's ex-wife and Veronica, Carmen, and Antonio's mother who is determined to take back Heritage House Vineyards. She owns Honeycroft Hotel and is a hotel tycoon.

Recurring
 Ariana Guerra as Rosa, Juana's sister in 1987
 Miguel Ángel García as Junior, Joe and Lettie's son and the youngest Sandoval sibling
 Andrew J. West as Michael Paxton, Veronica's husband
 Natalia del Riego as Daniela, an undocumented immigrant from El Salvador who is recently fired as a maid from the Sandoval mansion due to her immigration status
 Yul Vazquez as Father Ramos, Joe's brother and Mateo's father
 Tom Amandes as O.M. Honeycroft, Margaret's father in 1987
 Kerri Medders as Young Margaret
 Julio Macias as Javier, the newly hired general manager of Heritage House Vineyards and Antonio's secret former boyfriend

Episodes

Production

Development
In February 2021, ABC ordered a pilot for a family drama titled Promised Land, originally titled American Heritage, from writer and executive producer Matt Lopez. In April 2021, it was announced that Michael Cuesta would direct the pilot episode and be an executive producer. On August 11, 2021, Promised Land was given a series order. On May 6, 2022, ABC officially canceled the series after one season.

Casting
In March 2021, Christina Ochoa was cast to play the role of Veronica Sandoval. The following day, Mariel Molino landed the role of Carmen Sandoval. In April, it was announced that Andres Velez would portray Carlos Rincón. The following week, John Ortiz was cast in the role as Joe Sandoval. Three days later, Cecilia Suárez & Augusto Aguilera were cast as Lettie Sandoval and Mateo Flores respectively. The following week, Tonatiuh Elizarraraz was cast as Antonio Sandoval, and the day after that, Katya Martín was cast as Juana Sánchez. In May 2021, Rolando Chusan was cast as Billy Rincón. In October 2021, Bellamy Young was cast as Margaret Honeycroft. In January 2022, Yul Vazquez, Julio Macias, Ariana Guerra, Kerri Medders, Tom Amandes, Natalia del Riego, and Miguel Angel Garcia joined the cast in recurring roles.

Release
The series premiered on January 24, 2022, on ABC. Due to low ratings, ABC pulled Promised Land from the schedule, effective after the fifth episode on February 21, 2022. The last five episodes are set to stream exclusively on Hulu, starting from the sixth episode on March 1, 2022. Previously, episodes had been posted to Hulu next-day after premiere as is custom with ABC shows.

Reception

Critical response
The review aggregator website Rotten Tomatoes reported a 100% approval rating with an average rating of 7.4/10, based on 7 critic reviews. Metacritic, which uses a weighted average, assigned a score of 72 out of 100 based on 5 critics, indicating "generally favorable reviews".

Ratings

Notes

References

External links
 
 

2020s American drama television series
2022 American television series debuts
2022 American television series endings
American Broadcasting Company original programming
English-language television shows
Hispanic and Latino American television
Television series about families
Television series about wine
Television series by ABC Studios
Television series set in the 1980s
Television series set in the 2020s
Television shows set in Sonoma County, California